Air Chief Marshal Sir Anthony Wilkinson Heward,  (1 July 1918 – 27 October 1995) was a senior Royal Air Force (RAF) commander.

RAF career
Heward joined the Royal Air Force in 1936. He served in the Second World War as Officer Commanding No. 50 Squadron and then as Officer Commanding No. 97 Squadron before being made Personal Staff Officer to the Air Commander-in-Chief, RAF Mediterranean and Middle East in July 1945.

Promoted to group captain, he was appointed to the Air & Special Operations staff at Headquarters Supreme Headquarters Allied Powers Europe in 1957 and Station Commander at RAF Finningley in 1959. Then after attending the Imperial Defence College in 1962 he was promoted to air commodore and appointed Director of Operations (Bomber & Reconnaissance) at the Ministry of Defence in 1963. Promoted to air vice marshal, he was appointed Deputy Commander of RAF Germany in 1966, Air Officer for Administration at Headquarters RAF Air Support Command in 1969 and Chief of Staff at RAF Strike Command in 1970. Promoted to air marshal, he went on to be Air Officer Commanding No. 18 (Maritime) Group in February 1972 and Air Member for Supply and Organisation in 1973. He was promoted to air chief marshal in 1974 and retired in 1976.

In retirement he became a County councillor for Wiltshire.

Family
In 1944, he married Clare Myfanwy Wainwright, the daughter of Major-General C B Wainwright CB. They had two children.

References

|-

|-

1918 births
1995 deaths
Graduates of the Royal College of Defence Studies
Royal Air Force air marshals
Royal Air Force personnel of World War II
Knights Commander of the Order of the Bath
Officers of the Order of the British Empire
Recipients of the Air Force Cross (United Kingdom)
Recipients of the Distinguished Flying Cross (United Kingdom)
Members of Wiltshire County Council
Conservative Party (UK) councillors